Richard Hodges (by 1523 – 1572) was an English politician.

He was a Member (MP) of the Parliament of England for Westminster in April 1554, 1555 and 1559.

References

1572 deaths
English MPs 1554
English MPs 1555
English MPs 1559
Year of birth uncertain